is a Japanese football player. He plays for FC Kariya.

Club career

Tanjong Pagar United 
Tanaka signed for Tanjong Pagar United FC for the 2020 Singapore Premier League.

Club statistics
Updated to 02 February 2020.

References

External links
Profile at Briobecca Urayasu

J. League (#28)

1993 births
Living people
Association football people from Tokyo
Japanese footballers
J2 League players
Japan Football League players
Tokyo Verdy players
FC Machida Zelvia players
Briobecca Urayasu players
Renofa Yamaguchi FC players
Suzuka Point Getters players
Association football defenders